Lim Jung-bin (born February 4, 1993) is a South Korean football player.

Career
Lim Jung-bin played J2 League club Thespakusatsu Gunma in 2016.

References

External links

1993 births
Living people
South Korean footballers
J2 League players
Thespakusatsu Gunma players
Association football midfielders